Portland International Beerfest is a three-day beer festival in Portland, Oregon which is held annually.
The festival was founded in 2001 by Rick Carpenter.

About 

The Portland International Beerfest (PIB) is an annual festival of beers in Portland, Oregon. It is a three-day long event held around late June with a sister festival located in Seattle around the same time of year. The PIB is a beneficiary of Pet Cross, a federally registered charity. Each year the beer festivals donate roughly $20,000 to local animal welfare groups in Portland and Seattle. The PIB specializes in rare, hard-to-find, exotic beers from 16 countries, and also features unique and experimental pours from local breweries in the Pacific Northwest. Food is provided by local food trucks and there are activities and performances by local artists for entertainment.

History
NOTE: no Beer-fest in 2020.

References

External links

Beer festivals in the United States
Festivals in Portland, Oregon
Pearl District, Portland, Oregon
Annual events in Portland, Oregon
Beer in Oregon
Recurring events established in 2001
2001 establishments in Oregon